1964 flood may refer to:

 November 1964 Vietnam floods
 Christmas flood of 1964, affected the U.S. Pacific Northwest
 1964 Zagreb flood, affected northern Croatia and Slovenia